Ensure is an American brand of dietary supplements.

Ensure may also refer to:
Ensure Insurance, a former name of Allianz Nigeria Insurance

See also
Ensuring Positive Futures, UK
Insure